No. 82 Squadron RAF was a Royal Air Force squadron that was first formed in 1917 and last disbanded in 1963. It served at times as a bomber unit, a reconnaissance unit and lastly as an Intermediate Range Ballistic Missile (IRBM) unit.

History

Formation and First World War
No.82 Squadron Royal Flying Corps was formed at RAF Doncaster, Yorkshire as an army co-operation unit on 7 January 1917. It deployed to France flying Armstrong Whitworth FK8 aircraft on 20 November 1917, It was declared operational in January 1918, flying artillery spotting and photo-reconnaissance over the Western Front, flying heavily in response to the German spring offensive. It continued to fly army co-operation missions until the Armistice ended the fighting on the Western Front. The squadron was disbanded on 30 June 1919.

Reformation and Second World War
No. 82 Squadron was reformed as a light-bomber squadron from a flight detached from No. 142 Squadron, equipped with the Hawker Hind at RAF Andover on 14 June 1937 and joining No. 2 Group. The squadron transferred to No. 1 Group and moved to Cranfield on 8 July 1937. It re-equipped with Blenheim Mk Is during 1938, returning to 2 Group on 15 July that year and received the more advanced Blenheim Mk.IV in August 1939, moving to RAF Watton on 22 August.

The squadron started the Second World War flying anti-shipping missions over the North Sea, one of its aircraft sinking the  near Wilhelmshaven on 11 March 1940, though U-31 was subsequently raised, and returned to service being sunk by a destroyer in November. On 10 May 1940, Germany invaded France and the Low Countries, and 82 Squadron was deployed in attacks against the German forces. On 17 May, 12 Blenheims were sent to attack German forces near Gembloux, Belgium, but the expected escort did not show up, and after one Blenheim was shot by German flak, the remaining aircraft were intercepted by Messerschmitt Bf 109s, with ten more aircraft being shot down. 22 aircrew were killed and 3 taken prisoner. Despite these losses, it continued to fly missions in support of the BEF, and after the evacuation from Dunkirk, against German held airfields and invasion barges in the Channel ports.  On 13 August, a raid on an airfield at Aalborg, Denmark again suffered catastrophic losses to German fighters, losing eleven out of twelve.

From early 1941, the squadron played a prominent part in No. 2 Group's offensive against shipping in the English Channel and North Sea. Losses continued both to fighters and to flak defences.

A detachment was sent to Malta in May 1941, with the rest of the Squadron following in June. It flew ships against enemy shipping and ports through into July, but extremely heavy losses lead to it being withdrawn back to the UK at the end of the month, being replaced by 110 Squadron. Once back in the UK, it continued anti-shipping strikes as part of 2 Group.

To India
The squadron left Bomber Command and relocated to RAF Cholavarum, India in early 1942. Re-equipped with Vultee Vengeance dive-bombers the squadron began anti-submarine patrols on 17 November. In June 1943, the squadron began bombing operations against Imperial Japanese targets in Burma from RAF Salbani. it was deployed against the Japanese offensive against Imphal and Kohima. The squadron was re-equipped with Mosquitoes in July 1944, but was temporarily grounded due to failures in the wooden structure before commencing ground attack sorties on 19 December. These operations continued until 12 May 1945, when the squadron was withdrawn to India to prepare for the proposed invasion of Malaya. This operation did not occur due to the end of the war, and the squadron was disbanded on 15 March 1946.

Post-war operations in Africa
On 1 October 1946, the squadron was reformed at RAF Benson equipped with Avro Lancasters and Supermarine Spitfire PR. XIXs to undertake aerial surveys of Nigeria, the Gold Coast, Sierra Leone and Gambia. The squadron moved to Kenya in October 1947, it was flying from RAF Eastleigh by 1950. In 1952, the squadron relocated to the UK and was re-equipped with Canberras in November 1953, remaining in the reconnaissance role. On 1 September 1956 the squadron was disbanded.

On Thor missiles
No. 82 Squadron reformed once again on 22 July 1959 at RAF Shepherds Grove as a Thor missile unit, part of Project Emily. The upcoming ICBM missiles however soon made the Thor Intermediate Range Ballistic Missile obsolete, and in 1962 the Minister of Defence announced the phase-out of the Thor missiles. The unit therefore was disbanded the last time on 10 July 1963.

Aircraft operated

Squadron bases

See also
 List of UK Thor missile bases

References

Footnotes

Notes

Bibliography

External links

 82 Squadron. Royal Air Force.
 History of War

082
082
Military units and formations established in 1917
Ballistic missile squadrons of the Royal Air Force
Aircraft squadrons of the Royal Air Force in World War II
1917 establishments in the United Kingdom
Military units and formations disestablished in 1963
1963 disestablishments in the United Kingdom